Minster is an honorific title given to particular churches in England, most notably York Minster in Yorkshire, Westminster Abbey in London and Southwell Minster in Nottinghamshire.

The term minster is first found in royal foundation charters of the 7th century, when it designated any settlement of clergy living a communal life and endowed by charter with the obligation of maintaining the daily office of prayer. Widespread in 10th-century England, minsters declined in importance with the systematic introduction of parishes and parish churches from the 11th century onwards. The term continued as a title of dignity in later medieval England, for instances where a cathedral, monastery, collegiate church or parish church had originated with an Anglo-Saxon foundation. Eventually a minster came to refer more generally to "any large or important church, especially a collegiate or cathedral church". In the 21st century, the Church of England has designated additional minsters by bestowing the status on certain parish churches, the most recent elevation to minster status being St Mary Magdalene church in Taunton, Somerset on 13 March 2022, bringing the total number of current Church of England minsters to 31 (listed below).

Etymology 
The word minster (Old English mynster) was a rendering of the Latin monasterium, from Greek "μοναστήριον" ("monasterion"). In early English sources, monasterium and mynster were used interchangeably. They were applied to all communities who had devoted their lives to Christian observance, regardless of the gender of the occupants or the activities in which said occupants typically engaged. Monasterium was for instance applied equally to a small community of men living away from other secular settlements, to a large community of men and women living in a planned enclosure designed around a church, and to a widow and her unmarried daughters living in seclusion.

The modern English term "monastery" does not express the same connotations as the Latin monasterium, from which it derives, or the Old English mynster. This is because the term has come to be associated with contemplative regularity, such as that observed by the Benedictine or Cistercian orders, although this does not apply to the situation in Anglo-Saxon England prior to the tenth century.

By the tenth century, a gradual distinction between a "church" and a "mynster" began to emerge. For instance, in the Leechdoms, the sixteenth day was propitious for establishing a mynster, and the sixth day of the moon for founding a church. This suggests that by the tenth and eleventh centuries, mynster was being used to refer to a "superior church" which was regarded as long-established and to which people paid their dues.

An early appearance was in the Ecclesiastical History of the Venerable Bede (731).

History

Early and mid Anglo-Saxon periods 
The first minsters in the English-speaking parts of Britain were founded in the century after the mission to the Saxons led by Augustine of Canterbury in 597. The first cases for which documentary evidence has been preserved are Oswy's programme of 654/5, in which he endowed 12 small minsters, and a gift from Alhfrith to Wilfrid in around 660 to accompany the foundation of the minster at Ripon. An expansion of monasteries began around 670, with many substantial royal gifts of land. Kings made grants of land to named individuals to found a minster. In 734 Bede wrote a letter to Ecgbert (Archbishop of York), warning that noble families were abusing the privileged legal status accorded to the clergy, by making excessive landed endowments to minsters under their control. This reduced the overall stock of lands carrying the obligations of military service to the Northumbrian state.

Alan Thacker states: 

The word derives from the Old English "mynster", meaning "monastery", "nunnery", "mother church" or "cathedral", itself derived from the Latin "monasterium" and the Ancient Greek "μοναστήριον", meaning a group of clergy where the Brothers would cloister themselves to meditate . Thus, "minster" could apply to any church whose clergy followed a formal rule: as for example a monastery or a chapter; or to a church served by a less formal group of clergy living communally. In the earliest days of the English Church, from the 6th to the 8th centuries, minsters, in their various forms, constituted the only form of Christian institution with a permanent site. At the beginning of the period, they were the only form of permanent collective settlement in a culture that had not developed towns or cities. Kings, nobles and bishops were continually on the move, with their respective retinues, from estate to estate.

Minsters were commonly founded by the king or by a royal thegn, receiving a royal charter and a corporate endowment of bookland and other customary agricultural rights and entitlements within a broad territory; as well as exemption from certain forms of customary service (especially military). The superior of the minster was generally from the family of the founder. The minster's primary purpose was to support the king and the thegn in the regular worship of the divine office; especially through intercession in times of war. Minsters are also said to have been founded, or extensively endowed, in expiation for royal crimes; as for example Minster-in-Thanet near Ramsgate. Minsters might acquire pastoral and missionary responsibilities, for instance the three minsters of north-east Herefordshire, Leominster, Bromyard and Ledbury, all active in their areas before the towns were founded on episcopal manors; but initially this appear to have been of secondary importance. In the 9th century, almost all English minsters suffered severely from the depredations of Viking invaders; and even when a body of clergy continued, any form of regular monastic life typically ceased. The important role of minsters in the organisation of the early Christian church in Anglo-Saxon England has been called the "Minster hypothesis".

Late Saxon and Norman periods 
Following the English recovery in the 10th century, surviving minsters were often refounded in accordance with the new types of collective religious bodies then becoming widespread in Western Europe, as monasteries following the reformed Benedictine rule, or as collegiate churches or cathedral chapters following the rule of Chrodegang of Metz. Consequently, by the 11th century, a hierarchy of minsters became apparent; cathedral churches, or head minsters having pre-eminence within a diocese; surviving old minsters being pre-eminent within an area broadly equivalent to an administrative hundred; while newer lesser minsters and field churches were increasingly proliferating on local estates; the difference being that lesser minsters had graveyards, where field churches did not. Of particular importance for these developments, was the royal enforcement in this period of tithe as a compulsory religious levy on arable production. This vastly increased the resources available to support clergy; but at the same time strongly motivated local landowners to found their own local churches, so as to retain tithe income within their own estates.

In the 11th and 12th centuries former lesser minsters and field churches, typically served by individual priests, developed into the network of parishes familiar to this day. The old minsters mostly then were designated as parish churches. For these parish churches, their former pre-eminence was acknowledged by the occasional retention of the honorific title; and sometimes by the continued recognition of former estate churches within their ancient territories as being, in some degree, of subsidiary status and dignity. Otherwise however, old minsters might continue collective worship as collegiate churches; their clergy initially being designated as 'portioners', as each canon was supported by a set portion of the college's endowment income.  During the 11th and 12th centuries many such former minsters were provided with new statutes by which their endowments were split between their complement of canons, such that each canonry then became a 'prebend'; but otherwise numbers of former minsters continued as 'portioner' colleges through the medieval period.

Late-20th- and 21st-century additions 
The Church of England has designated additional minsters in the 20th and 21st centuries, by adding an honorific title to existing parish churches. These have included Dewsbury (1994), Sunderland Minster (1998), Preston (2003), Rotherham (2004),  Stoke (2005), and  Newport (2008). St Andrew's Church, Plymouth became a minster church in late 2009. The Parish Church of St. John the Baptist in Halifax, West Yorkshire was elevated to minster status in November 2009. St James's Church in Grimsby was dedicated as a minster on 16 May 2010. Croydon Parish Church was rededicated as Croydon Minster on 29 May 2011 by the Bishop of Southwark. The elevation of two churches in the Diocese of Norwich was announced in October 2011: St Margaret's Church Kings Lynn and St Nicholas, Great Yarmouth. Leeds Parish Church became Leeds Minster on 2 September 2012. St Mary's Church, Cheltenham became Cheltenham Minster on 3 February 2013. Holy Trinity, Hull became a minster on 13 May 2017. The most recent elevation to minster status is St Mary Magdalene church which became Taunton Minster on 13 March 2022.

Current

Footnotes

Sources
 
 

History of cathedrals
Churches in England
Types of church buildings